"Scars" is the second single from the debut album, Just Like You, of American Idol season eight finalist Allison Iraheta. It was written by Toby Gad and Elyssa James. Gad also produced the track.

Critical reception
Reception of "Scars" has been generally positive.

Entertainment Weekly'''s Michael Slezak wrote "Meanwhile, ballads like the understated Scars and the bluesy Trouble Is separate Iraheta from questionably abled Miley/Selena contemporaries. Girl. Can. Sang!".

Kelsey Paine from Billboard.com agreed writing "soulful tunes like "Scars" and the bluesy "Trouble Is" showcase the raw talent that made Iraheta a star on "Idol" and set her apart from other young pop upstarts."

AOL Radio writer Sara D Anderson praises Scars, noting "'Scars' is one of the many songs (others 'Robot Love,' 'Trouble Is' and 'Friday I'll Be Over U') critically appraised off her debut album that showcases her husky yet powerful vocals and spunky attitude."

Promotion
Iraheta performed the song on February 25, 2010, on the Top 24 elimination episode of the ninth season of American Idol. She also performed an acoustic version of the song on JoJo Wright's radio show JoJo on the Radio on KIIS-FM. Due to Iraheta's popularity in Asia, Iraheta also headlined concerts in Manila and Bali, performing 'Scars' at both.

Sales

Media appearance
The song was featured on the TV special Monster High: New Ghoul @ School''.

References 

Allison Iraheta songs
2010 singles
Songs written by Toby Gad
Song recordings produced by Toby Gad
19 Recordings singles
Jive Records singles
2009 songs